Song Yuren (Chinese: 宋育仁; 1857-1931), word name Ziyun and Daofu, from Fushun, Sichuan, was Qing Dynasty Jinshi and early period positive reformist philosopher of China.

Experience
In Guangxu 12th year (1886), he became Jinshi of Dynasty court then he was granted of Shujishi and  Jiantao of Hanlin Academy. 
In Guangxu 13th year (1887), he finished his literature current affairs theory for learning western countries and reform of monarch system. About 7 years later, he was appointed as diplomatic officer of British. In the period, he was connected with western country scholars and officials to communicate opinions, such as Max Muller, between western and eastern culture. He has been discussed with Japanese politician Mochizuki Kotaro (望月小太郎) about consistent standard pronunciation of Chinese character in historical evolving.

After Sino-Japanese War, he urged to form a marine fleet of Australia, sailing from Philippines to Japan main island and Nagasaki to destroy defense force of Japan. However, Dynasty court was stopped the plan and instructed him back from overseas.

In 1896, he began to hold business and mineral activities in Sichuan and Chongqing. He died in 1931 at Chengdu, Sichuan.

References

1857 births
1931 deaths
Chinese revolutionaries